The South African 3rd Infantry Division was an infantry division of the South African Army during World War II.

History 

This division was formed in South Africa on 23 October 1940 with its headquarters in Pretoria.

The 3rd Infantry Division as a whole did not go into combat, but its 7th Motorized brigade group participated in the 1942 Invasion of Madagascar. The division organised and trained the South African home defence forces, performed garrison duties and trained and supplied replacements for the 1st and 2nd Divisions deployed to East Africa and later to the Western Desert.

The division was based in Pretoria until 1942, whereafter the division then moved to  
Ermelo in the Eastern Transvaal, although its constituent units were deployed as far as the then South West Africa. 
   
On 4 April 1942 the division was redesignated the South African 3rd Armoured Division. This division was disbanded on 17 May 1943, without ever having been deployed. However, one of the division's constituent units, the 7th Motorised Brigade, did take part in the invasion of Madagascar.

Major General Hermanus Botha was the commander of the division from 23 August 1940 until its redesignation.

Order of battle
On formation in October 1940, the Division was structured as follows:
Division Troops
6th Light Field Brigade, SAA
8th, 9th, 10th Field Companies, SAEC?
17th Divisional Field Park Company, SAEC?
7th South African Infantry Brigade (Raised 11 July 1940 at Premier Mine)
1st Pretoria Regiment
1st Witwatersrand Rifles
Regiment de la Rey
8th South African Infantry Brigade (Raised 1 July 1940 in East London. Disbanded November 1940.)
The Cape Town Highlanders
Prince Alfred's Guard
The First City Regiment                                       
9th South African Infantry Brigade (Raised 15 July 1940 at Premier Mine)
Regiment President Steyn (Until 22 Nov 40)
Die Middelandse Regiment
Regiment Westelike Provinsie (Until 1 Sep 40)
2nd Pretoria Regiment (From Sep - Oct 40)
2nd Transvaal Scottish (From 4 Sep - 21 Nov 40)
2nd Royal Natal Carbineers (From 9 Sep - 3 Oct 40)
1st Regiment Botha (From Sep - Nov 40)
1st Pretoria Highlanders (From Nov 40)
The Cape Town Highlanders (From 6 Nov 40)
2nd Natal Mounted Rifles (From 23 Nov 40)
10th South African Infantry Brigade (Raised July 1940.  Replaced 8th Bde in Nov 40.)
The Kimberley Regiment
2nd Witwatersrand Rifles
The First City Regiment
11th South African Infantry Brigade (Raised July 1940. Disbanded October 1940.)
2nd Witwatersrand Rifles
1st South-West African Infantry Battalion
2nd Imperial Light Horse
12th South African Infantry Brigade (Raised July 1940. Disbanded September 1940.)
2nd Royal Natal Carbineers
2nd Pretoria Regiment
2nd Rand Light Infantry

Citations

South African World War II divisions
Infantry divisions of South Africa
Military units and formations of South Africa in World War II
Military units and formations established in 1940
Military units and formations of the British Empire in World War II
Military units and formations disestablished in 1942